Neal Vernon Baker (April 30, 1904 – January 5, 1982) was an American Major League Baseball pitcher. He played for the Philadelphia Athletics during the  season.

Baker attended the University of Texas where he played baseball, was drafted into the Majors but only spent one year there, before spending the rest of his playing career in the minor leagues. He played in the Minors until 1936.

References

1904 births
1982 deaths
Major League Baseball pitchers
Philadelphia Athletics players
Baseball players from Texas
Texas Longhorns baseball players
Sportspeople from Harris County, Texas